Brian Gallivan is an American actor, writer and comedian. He gained significant attention for his Second City Network web series Sassy Gay Friend, based on a character he created in 2004 Second City mainstage revue Red Scare. The series shows events that may have transpired if famous women (and a few men) in literature, film and history had been advised by the titular character.

Career
Gallivan got his start improvising in his hometown of Boston as well as performing at the Bambi Masterpiece Theater, before moving to Chicago in 2003, where he performed at The Second City between 2003 and 2007, appearing in four mainstage revues, including the long-running Between Barack and a Hard Place. He was twice nominated for Joseph Jefferson Awards for his work while there.

Gallivan appeared in the Matt Damon film The Informant! and in the Derek Westerman web series Bad Dads alongside Michael Cera. Gallivan appeared in the feature film A Thousand Words.

Gallivan was a writer on the NBC sitcom Are You There, Chelsea? and the ABC comedy series Happy Endings.

For the 2014–15 television season, Gallivan created and produced the CBS television sitcom The McCarthys, which was cancelled in early 2015.

Filmography

Personal life
Gallivan is gay. He is from Dedham, Massachusetts.

References

External links

Living people
American sketch comedians
American male television actors
American television writers
American male television writers
American gay actors
Gay comedians
Television producers from Massachusetts
American male web series actors
21st-century American male actors
LGBT producers
Upright Citizens Brigade Theater performers
American gay writers
LGBT people from Massachusetts
21st-century American comedians
Year of birth missing (living people)
People from Dedham, Massachusetts
21st-century American screenwriters
21st-century American male writers
21st-century LGBT people
American LGBT comedians